Qaruh Island is an island belonging to the state of Kuwait, which received its name from the large amounts of petroleum sediments in the area (known as Qar in Arabic). It is the smallest of the nine islands, and also the furthest island from the Kuwaiti mainland.  It is located 37.5 kilometres east of the mainland coast, and 17 kilometres northeast of Umm al Maradim. The island is roughly 275 meters long by 175 meters at its widest (area about 3.5 ha. The island was also the first part of Kuwaiti soil that was liberated from Iraq during the Gulf War on January 21, 1991.

See also

List of lighthouses in Kuwait

References

External links
 Pictures of the liberation of Qaruh Island
 Picture of the Jazirat Qaruh Lighthouse

Uninhabited islands of Kuwait
Lighthouses in Kuwait